For a Just Cause is a socrealist novel by Russian writer Vasily Grossman, first published in 1952. A revised English translation, including additional material from Grossman's unpublished manuscripts, was published under the author's preferred title, Stalingrad, in 2019. It is the predecessor to Grossman's more widely read Life and Fate.

Historical context 

Most of the events of Stalingrad take place in the Soviet Union starting in the months before Nazi Germany's invasion Operation Barbarossa, and up through mid-September in the first month of the Battle of Stalingrad.

The book describes the individual shock of the 22 June 1941 invasion for many of its characters as the German invasion completely altered life for Soviets everywhere.

The book follows the members and friends of the Shaposhnikov family as they work and then fight or flee from Western SSRs to Stalingrad by 1942. The German attack on Stalingrad began on August 23, 1942, with 1600 bomber sorties dropping high explosives and incendiaries, completely destroying the city. Some of Grossman's characters are allowed to flee the city, some die fleeing, some fight or work while the immense battle continues around them.

The book asserts that the Germans effectively lost World War II by mid-September 1942, after they failed to take Stalingrad.

Background

Grossman wrote Stalingrad starting in 1943. The book was extensively edited through a number of editions. It was intended to be the “War and Peace” of World War II (“The Great Patriotic War” in Soviet parlance.) It was published in pieces at first, but was subject to extensive political censorship and pressures. While Joseph Stalin ruled, Grossman could not criticize Stalin or the Soviet central commands. As Stalin's government shifted, Grossman had to add or subtract pieces. He added new pieces to more broadly cover the Soviet war experiences, such as mining and food production; he subtracted parts that too strongly lauded Jewish contributions. By 1953, Stalin had become paranoid over a Jewish conspiracy; he feared that Jewish doctors were trying to assassinate him. Grossman, himself being Jewish, was fortunate to escape arrest and luckily, Stalin suddenly died. In the next few years, his book was again edited and republished as "part 1" of Grossman's “War and Peace” for the Great Patriotic War.

Stalingrad, as translated by Robert and Elizabeth Chandler, tried to include all of Grossman's texts. The Chandlers' inclusion rules were based on guessing Grossman's wishes: include any text that Grossman “liked”, even if it was on a topic that was forced on him by outside forces, conversely, don't add anything that would cause a plot conflict or that Grossman himself had deleted. The result is a book that can be seen as “designed by committee”. There are many plot lines, many of which are left unresolved or unmentioned for the rest of the book. This near-1000 page Stalingrad is only the prelude to his more popular second novel Life and Fate, written in 1959, well after Stalin's death, and first published in 1980. The second book resolves the majority of the incomplete plot lines from Stalingrad.

Since this book was written primarily before Stalin's death, it necessarily lauds him. It describes the basic ideas for “inevitable” Soviet victory, mostly through friends and relatives of the Shaposhnikov family.

Main characters

Grossman has a plot line to emphasize each key Soviet strength. However, in Stalingrad, these roles are not fully developed when it ends in mid-September 1942. The characters are loosely connected to the Shaposhnikov family of Stalingrad.

 Alexandra Vladimirovna Shaposhnikov: around 65 years old. Matriarch “granny” (grandmother). Widowed, bacteriology teacher and chemist, headed a small lab to monitor factory working conditions, loved people and her work.

 Ludmilla Nikolaevna Shaposhnikov: around 46 years old, eldest daughter of Alexandra. Nearly completed a Ph.D. in Chemistry. Briefly married to renegade-type named Abarchuk, had one son ("Tolya") and was divorced. Remarried Victor Shtrum, had a daughter ("Nadya") and tended house until the war started. Withdrew 400 miles east to Kazan, getting a job as a factory chemist.

 Victor Pavlovich Shtrum: Ludmila's current husband of 20 years, a brilliant physicist, running a big experiment needing high quality steel in Moscow in 1942. He invented and deployed a new way to control steel-alloy smelting.
 “Tolya” Lt. Anatoly Shaposhnikov: around 22 years old. Ludmila's son by Abarchuk; as the war began, he volunteered and was commissioned a Lieutenant in Artillery. In this book he is mentioned mainly as a worry for his mother Ludmila.
 “Nadya” Shaposhnikov: around 18 years old. Ludmila's daughter, by Shtrum. She is mentioned only as a high school student.
 Marusya Spiridonova: around 43 years old. Alexandra's second (middle) daughter who ran a children's hospital in Stalingrad. She was among those allowed to evacuate across the Volga.
 Stepan Fyodorovich Spiridonova: around 50 years old. Marusya's husband, the director of the main Stalingrad coal-power generating station. This station remained open through the first month of the battle, despite daily bombing, shelling and direct assaults.
 Vera Spiridonova: around 20 years old. The daughter of Marusya and Stepan who worked as a nurse in the hospital.
 Sergeant Viktorov: around 22 years old. A fighter pilot in Vera's hospital recovering from crash wounds. He is in love with Vera.
 Dmitry Shaposhnikov: around 40 years old. Alexandra's son, arrested by Russian police in 1937, sentenced to help build the White Sea Canal. Rarely mentioned in this volume.
 Seryozha Shaposhnikov: around 17 years old, Dmitry's son, adopted by Alexandra after Dmitry's arrest; joined the Stalingrad militia (lied about age) in July 1942. He was assigned to a mortar squad commanded by a martinette named Kryakin. His squad included the scrounger “deserter” Gradusov, the smart and confident Komsomol engineer Chentsov, and the over-age veteran carpenter Polyakov.
 “Zhenya” Yevgenia Nikolaevna Shaposhnikov: around 22 years old. Alexandra's third (and youngest) daughter, an attractive art/dance student in Moscow who had married and the divorced Colonel Krymov. She had returned to the "safety" of Stalingrad during the retreats of 1941.
 Krymov (Nikolay Grigorievich): around 45 years old, Zhenya's ex husband. He fought in 1918-22 civil war and was reassigned as a Red Army Political commissar before this war. After being surrounded in the 1941 blitz in western Ukraine, Krymov led 200 soldiers and civilians on a heroic and desperate fighting retreat through 500km of German-held territory. He became a key leader in the Stalingrad defense.
 Novikov (Colonel Pyotr Pavlovich): spends a lot of the 1942 summer waiting to be assigned and was eventually given a tank corps command. He hoped to marry Zhenya.
 Ivan Novikov (Novikov's brother): a coal mine shaft driller, providing heroic quantities of high quality coal to enable Russian steel quality. His story was included by the request of Soviet politicians, to represent the sacrifices of workers.
 Mostovskoy (Mikhail Sidorovich): around 65 years old, a longtime Bolshevik, who knew Alexandra even in 1910 when he was a clandestine Communist organizer. He fought in the 1917-1922 Russian Civil War; at least part of that time he was a guerilla behind the White movement lines.
 Andreyev (Pavel Andreyevich): around 68 years old, an old friend of Alexandra and the best worker in the Krasny Oktyabr (steel plant).
 Senior Lieutenant Filyashkin: around 22 years old, he is not related to the other characters. His story is the true story of a key episode in the battle, who's actual name was Lieutenant Anton Kuzmich Dragan.

References

1952 novels
2019 novels
Socrealist novels
Novels set during World War II
Novels set in Russia